Colonel Matthew Bogdanos is an Assistant District Attorney in Manhattan (since 1988), author, boxer, and a retired colonel in the United States Marine Corps. Following the September 11, 2001 attacks, Bogdanos deployed to Afghanistan where he was awarded a Bronze Star for actions against Al-Qaeda and the Taliban. In 2003, while on active duty in the Marine Corps, he led an investigation into the looting of Iraq's National Museum, and was subsequently awarded the National Humanities Medal for his efforts. Returning to the District Attorney’s Office in 2010, he created and still heads the Antiquities Trafficking Unit, “the only one of its kind in the world.” He had previously gained national attention for the prosecution of Sean Combs, who was acquitted of weapons and bribery charges in a 2001 trial stemming from a 1999 nightclub shootout.

Education
Bogdanos attended Don Bosco Preparatory High School in New Jersey and later Bucknell University in Pennsylvania. He holds a bachelor's in classical studies from Bucknell and a degree in law from Columbia University Law School. He also has a master's degree in Classical Studies from Columbia University and another Master's in Strategic Studies from the United States Army War College.

Biography

Bogdanos is one of a set of twins born and raised in New York to a Greek father, Konstantine, and a French mother, Claire. He is one of four children. Growing up he waited tables in his parents' Greek restaurant, Deno's Place, in lower Manhattan.

Bogdanos enlisted into the United States Marine Corps Reserve in January 1977, while still a freshman. In 1988 he resigned from active duty to join the Manhattan district attorney's office. Following the September 11, 2001 attacks, Bogdanos returned to full-time active duty.

In 1996, Bogdanos led a counter-narcotics action on the Mexico–United States border, he was active during Operation Desert Storm and served in South Korea, Lithuania, Guyana, Kazakhstan, Uzbekistan and Kosovo. In 2001 he was part of a law enforcement, counter-terrorism team deployed to Afghanistan, where he was awarded a Bronze Star for actions against Al-Qaeda for, according to the bronze Star citation, “seizing unexpected opportunities and relying on his personal courage often at great personal risk.

In March 2003 he was promoted to colonel and deployed to Iraq as head of the team. During his stint in Iraq, the Iraq Museum in Baghdad was sacked and thousands of valuable antiquities were stolen. For over five years Bogdanos led a team to recover the artifacts. Up to 2006 approximately 10000 artifacts were recovered through his efforts. Antiquities recovered include the Warka Vase and The Mask of Warka. Bogdanos wrote a memoir, Thieves of Baghdad: One Marine's Passion for Ancient Civilizations and the Journey to Recover the World's Greatest Stolen Treasures, which he co-wrote with William Patrick. The book chronicles his efforts to recover the missing Iraqi artifacts. In November 2005, he was awarded a National Humanities Medal from President George W. Bush for his efforts to recover the artifacts. He has also received the 2004 Public Service Award from the Hellenic Lawyers of America, the 2006 Distinguished Leadership Award from the Washington DC Historical Society, and a 2007 Proclamation from the City of New York, among other awards. Deployed to Afghanistan in 2009 with NATO counter-insurgency forces, he was released back into the Marine Reserves in September 2010 and returned to the District Attorney’s Office.

In 2006, he tried to form a New York task force to prosecute antiquities trafficking. He was initially rebuffed by his immediate bosses at the Manhattan District Attorney’s Office. When Cyrus Vance Jr. became District Attorney in 2010, he authorized Bogdanos to prosecute antiquities trafficking, but with no additional resources assigned. For the next six years, he and Special Agent Brenton Easter, a federal agent with Homeland Security investigations, worked dozens of cases, including one of the largest seizures of stolen antiquities in U.S. history, more than 2600 idols valued at more than $143 million and seized from renowned New York dealer Subhash Kapoor who is on trial in India and awaiting extradition to New York. By 2017, Bogdanos and Easter were making so many antiquities trafficking cases, that Bogdanos was sleeping in his office. When supervisors alerted District Attorney Vance, he approved the creation of the first-of-its-kind Antiquities trafficking Unit consisting of prosecutors, federal agents, New York City detectives, and specialized analysts.  Since then, the Unit has grown to 16 personnel. Since 2010, Bogdanos and his team have convicted a dozen traffickers, seized more than 4000 antiquities valued at more than $200 million, and repatriated more than 2000 antiquities to almost two dozen countries. Among the seizures was a golden first-century-B.C. Egyptian coffin that the Metropolitan Museum of Art had acquired for $4 million and was made famous when Kim Kardashian posed for a photo next to the coffin at the 2018 Met Gala.

As a Senior Trial Counsel in the District Attorney’s Office, Bogdanos still prosecutes homicides, what he describes as being “connected to the worst moment in people’s lives.”  In 2015, Bogdanos successfully convicted pharmaceuticals executive Gigi Jordan for poisoning her 8-year-old autistic son, Jude, by forcing him to ingest hydrocodone, ambien, and Xanax, washing them down his throat with orange juice and vodka. Jordan was convicted of manslaughter and sentenced to 18 years in prison. In 2019, Bogdanos convicted Roderick Covlin of murdering his wealthy wife, Shele Covlin, for her money. Covlin tried to frame his 9-year-old daughter for the murder, but Bogdanos successfully disproved that defense. Covlin was sentenced to 25 years to life in prison.

Bogdanos is also a former middleweight boxer with almost 30 amateur fights and is still boxing, with a record of 10-2 since his 40th birthday. Along with another Assistant District Attorney, fellow U.S. Marine officer Al Peterson, he co-founded a Charity Boxing Foundation called Battle of the Barristers that has raised more than $1 million for wounded veterans and children at risk.

Personal life
Bogdanos has four children with his wife, Claudia Tuchman Bogdanos, a lawyer at Quinn Emanuel Urquhart & Sullivan. One of his sons, Michael, is also a Marine Infantry Officer.

Awards and recognition

Military awards

Other awards
 Ellis Island Medal of Honor - May 2011
 Grand Marshal, Greek Independence Day Parade, New York City - 2010
 City of Philadelphia Proclamation - February 2009
 New York City Proclamation - April 2007
 Distinguished Leadership Award, Washington DC Historical Society - June 2006
 National Humanities Medal, from President George W. Bush, White House - November 2005
 Hellenic Lawyers Association Public Service Award - November 2004

Publications

 
Thieves of Baghdad is his first-hand account of his journey to recover Iraq’s lost treasures. His royalties from the sale of the book go to the Iraq Museum.

See also

National Museum of Iraq

Notes

References
   Book review with short author profile.

External links

Living people
Year of birth missing (living people)
New York (state) lawyers
United States Marine Corps personnel of the Iraq War
United States Marine Corps personnel of the War in Afghanistan (2001–2021)
American military writers
American writers of Greek descent
Bucknell University alumni
Columbia Law School alumni
Don Bosco Preparatory High School alumni
National Humanities Medal recipients
Recipients of the Defense Superior Service Medal
United States Marine Corps colonels
United States Marine Corps reservists
United States Army War College alumni